This article lists the heads of state of Panama since the short-lived first independence from the Republic of New Granada in 1840 and the final separation from Colombia in 1903.

Free State of the Isthmus (1840–1841)

Republic of Panama (1903–present)

President of the Municipal Council of Panama and de facto President (1903)

Members of the Provisional Government Junta (1903–1904)

Presidents of Panama (1904–present)

Military leaders of Panama (1968–1989)

From 1968 to 1989 a military junta exerted actual control over the country and nominated the president, who himself held little power. The following individuals were leaders of the junta.

Latest election

See also
 Politics of Panama
 List of political parties in Panama
 History of Panama

References 

Panama, List of presidents of
List
Heads of state of Panama
1904 establishments in Panama